Maialen Lujanbio (born 26 November 1976) is a Basque poet and bertsolari winner. She composes her oral poetry in the Basque language and she is the only woman to ever reach her level.

Life
Lujanbio was born in Hernani in 1976. She took an interest in the Basque oral tradition of poetry whilst at secondary school. She attended specialist classes and continued to practise whilst at the University of the Basque Country. She won prizes at the junior and then senior level introducing novel approaches to the poetry discipline. In 1994 she became the Champion of Gipuzkoa.

In 2003 she wrote for the Basque newspaper, Berria, completing a column each day.

In 2007-8 she took a postgraduate course at Mondragon University in the Basque language and its transmission.

In 2009, Maialen Lujanbio Zugasti became the first woman to win the championship. In 2013 she was second just after Amets Arzallus and in 2017 and 2022 she won for the second and third time the Bertsolari Main Championship.

Solo challenge in 2009 
Maialen, you are a doctor. You're observing two children suffering from cancer organising a wheelchair race in a hospital corridor, to which she composed the following bertso:

References

1976 births
Living people
People from Hernani
Bertsolaris
University of the Basque Country alumni